The Toronto International Film Festival People's Choice Award for Midnight Madness is an annual film award, presented by the Toronto International Film Festival to the film rated as the year's most popular film in the festival's "Midnight Madness" stream of underground and cult films. The award was first introduced in 2009.

Process
The voting process is the same as for the feature film People's Choice: at each Midnight Madness film screening, attendees are invited to "vote" for the film by leaving their ticket stubs in voting boxes outside the theatre after the show.

Winners

See also
Midnight film
Underground film
Cult film

References

People's Choice Midnight Madness
Audience awards
Awards established in 2009